D'un matin de printemps is a musical work for violin, cello or flute and piano or orchestra, composed by Lili Boulanger.

History
Originally composed as a duet for violin and piano, from the spring of 1917 the work was adapted as a trio version for violin, cello, and piano in 1917, and as a duet for flute and piano in the same year. In January 1918, Boulanger wrote an orchestral version. D'un matin de printemps was the last orchestral work composed by Boulanger before her death in 1918.

Analysis
Unlike many of Boulanger's other works, this work was written to charm, with a fresh and joyful character. The Belgian musicologist Harry Halbreich wrote:

The music critic Gerald Larner wrote that it contains more accents of Debussy than the rest of her work.

Discography 
 Yehudi Menuhin (violin) and Clifford Curzon (piano), EMI (1967)
 Olivier Charlier (violin) and Émile Naoumoff (piano), Marco Polo (1993)
 Luxembourg Philharmonic Orchestra directed by Mark Stringer, Timpani (1998)
 BBC Philharmonic directed by Yan Pascal Tortelier, Chandos (1999)

References

External links 
 
 

Compositions by Lili Boulanger
Violin sonatas
Piano sonatas
Compositions for symphony orchestra